The AN/PRC-10 is an American VHF portable radio transceiver, introduced in 1951 as a replacement for the wartime SCR-300 set. The AN/PRC-8 and AN/PRC-9 sets are basically the same but cover lower frequency bands. It remained in service with the American military until the mid 1960s when it was replaced by the transistorized AN/PRC-25 set.

Technical specifications 
FM, superheterodyne radio transceiver
Frequency coverage:
AN/PRC-10: 38.0 to 54.9 MHz VHF version used by infantry
AN/PRC-9: 27.0 to 38.9 MHz HF/VHF version used by artillery
AN/PRC-8: 20.0 to 27.9 MHz HF band version used by armoured units
Tuning: Single calibrated dial mechanically tunes both receiver and transmitter simultaneously via ganged variable capacitors
Receiver sensitivity: 0.7 μV
Receiver selectivity: 80 kHz @ −6 dB
Intermediate frequency: 4.3 MHz
Transmitter RF output: 0.9 watts
Circuitry: 16 vacuum tubes
Dimensions: 10.4" × 3" × 18.5" including battery compartment
Weight: 26 pounds including battery pack and accessories
Power supply options: 
BA-279/U dry battery providing 1.5, 6, 67.5 and 135 volts
AM-598 PSU and amplifier operating from a 24-volt vehicle supply
Antenna systems: 
Short: 3-foot AT-272, folding steel tape whip
Long: 10-foot AT-271, collapsible 7 section fishing pole whip joined by an internal stainless steel cable
External: 50-ohm BNC connector
Built in crystal calibrator

References

External links 
 https://www.radiomuseum.org/r/military_prc_10_rt_176a_prc_10.html
 https://www.n6cc.com/prc-10-infantry-radio

Military radio systems of the United States
Military equipment of the Vietnam War
Military electronics of the United States